Mitterkirchen im Machland is a municipality in the district of Perg in the Austrian state of Upper Austria.

Population

References

Cities and towns in Perg District